Albert Gerard Schatz (August 4, 1921 – April 30, 1985) was a United States district judge of the United States District Court for the District of Nebraska.

Education and career

Born in Omaha, Nebraska, Schatz received an Artium Baccalaureus degree from the University of Nebraska in 1943 and was a United States Marine Corps Captain from 1943 to 1946. He then received a Bachelor of Laws from Creighton University School of Law in 1948. He was a law clerk to Judge Joseph William Woodrough of the United States Court of Appeals for the Eighth Circuit from 1948 to 1950. Schatz was then in private practice in Omaha from 1950 to 1973.

Federal judicial service

On April 12, 1973, Schatz was nominated by President Richard Nixon to a seat on the United States District Court for the District of Nebraska vacated by Judge Richard A. Dier. Schatz was confirmed by the United States Senate on May 10, 1973, and received his commission on May 11, 1973, serving until his death on April 30, 1985.

References

Sources
 

1921 births
1985 deaths
Judges of the United States District Court for the District of Nebraska
United States district court judges appointed by Richard Nixon
20th-century American judges
United States Marine Corps officers
20th-century American lawyers
Creighton University School of Law alumni
People from Omaha, Nebraska
University of Nebraska alumni
United States Marine Corps personnel of World War II